Dan Hildebrand is a British stage, TV, and movie actor.

Career
He was educated at Highgate School in north London. He has appeared in TV shows such as Sons of Anarchy, Lost, NYPD Blue and Longmire as well as playing two separate roles in Deadwood. Hildebrand also had a recurring role as Kraznys mo Nakloz in season three of HBO's Game of Thrones.

Hildebrand is heavily involved in philanthropic work and rebuilding communities impacted by natural disasters, and in December 2013 was honored at the Social Impact Awards in Los Angeles.

Selected filmography

Film

Television

Video games

References

External links

20th-century British male actors
21st-century British male actors
Living people
Place of birth missing (living people)
British male actors
Year of birth missing (living people)